CBS Studios, Inc. is an American television production company which is a subsidiary of CBS Entertainment Group unit of Paramount Global. It was formed on January 17, 2006, by CBS Corporation as CBS Paramount Television, as a renaming of the original incarnation of the Paramount Television studio. 

It is the television production arm of the CBS network (CBS Productions previously assumed such functions until 2004, when it was merged into Paramount Television), and, along with Warner Bros. Discovery through its Warner Bros. Television Studios, it is also the television production arm of The CW (in which Paramount has a 12.5% ownership stake).

Background and timeline

CBS
In 1952 the Columbia Broadcasting System formed an in-house television production unit, CBS Productions (commonly referred to as The CBS Television Network), as well as facilities in the newly established Television City in the Fairfax District, Los Angeles in Westside.  Also formed is CBS Television Film Sales (later known as CBS Films) as the distributor of off-network and first-run syndicated programming to local television stations in the United States and abroad.

In 1963, CBS Studio Center is established in Studio City, Los Angeles district of Los Angeles in the San Fernando Valley. Later in 1971, CBS Films is spun off as Viacom International, Inc. The company is re-established as CBS, Inc., in 1974. In 1978, the production unit gained the secondary/alternate name CBS Entertainment Productions.

In 1994, Westinghouse Electric acquired CBS. Viacom merged with its creator CBS, in 1999.

Paramount Pictures' early television ventures
In 1939, experimental television stations were established in Los Angeles (W6XYZ) as Television Productions Inc. and Chicago (W9XBK) with Balaban and Katz. Commercial broadcasting began in 1943 over WBKB in Chicago (now WBBM-TV). Commercial broadcasting began in 1947 over KTLA in Los Angeles. In 1949, the first major studio to establish program syndication as Paramount Television Network (much of which originated from KTLA). Paramount branched out of broadcasting in 1964 with the sale of KTLA to Gene Autry.

Desilu Productions
Desilu Productions was formed in 1950 by Desi Arnaz and Lucille Ball. Desilu Studios was established in Hollywood and Culver City in 1957, after Arnaz/Ball purchased the RKO Pictures studio lot. Desilu Sales Inc. was formed in 1962 as the company's syndication arm. In 1967, Desilu Productions was acquired by Gulf and Western Industries. The company became the TV division of Paramount Pictures Corporation in July, retaining the Desilu name until the end of that year. Desilu Sales, in turn, merges with Paramount's syndication division to become Paramount Television Sales.

Paramount Television
From 1966 to 1967, Gulf+Western acquired Paramount Pictures. In 1968 Paramount Television, formerly Desilu, was established as the studio's television production unit. In 1977, Paramount Television Service was formed. In 1982 Paramount Television Group and Paramount Domestic Television and Video Programming was established. In September 1989, Gulf+Western was reincorporated as Paramount Communications, Inc.. On March 11, 1994, Viacom acquired Paramount Communications. In 1995, Viacom launched the United Paramount Network (UPN) with Chris-Craft Industries.

CBS Paramount Television
On August 10, 2004 Viacom merged the international television banners of CBS Broadcast International and Paramount International Television to form CBS Studios International. On September 7, 2004, Viacom merged CBS Productions and Paramount Network Television to form a new entity of Paramount Network Television, aka the CBS Paramount Television Entertainment Group, with CBS Productions becoming an in-name only unit.

On January 1, 2006, as the CBS/Viacom split took effect, CBS inherited Paramount's television program library, with the second incarnation of Viacom keeping Paramount's films, the MTV Networks and the BET Networks. On January 17, 2006, CBS Corporation CEO Les Moonves announced that Paramount Television would be renamed CBS Paramount Television as of that day, and the network division becoming CBS Paramount Network Television, and the domestic distribution arm becoming CBS Paramount Domestic Television. 

On September 26, 2006, CBS Corporation merged its television distribution arms—King World, CBS Paramount International Television and CBS Paramount Domestic Television—to form CBS Television Distribution (CBSTVD). CBS Home Entertainment was then established as a subsidiary of the latter. 

On May 17, 2009, the Paramount name was dropped after a -year loan of its use from sister company Viacom, forming CBS Television Studios.

National Amusements retained majority control of both CBS and the second Viacom. For a short time, many of Paramount's theatrical films were distributed domestically by CBS Television Distribution (the new name for the distribution arm as of 2007).  Paramount Home Entertainment continues to distribute home video sales of CBS shows through the CBS DVD brand.

From 2009 until 2011, all shows produced by the company aired on either CBS or The CW. In the past, Paramount Television produced shows for all networks, but especially had a good relationship with ABC (much as Universal Television had a good relationship with eventually sister network NBC). The Cleaner, which aired on A&E until September 2009, was the most recent show from the company to air on a network other than CBS or the CW (which is ironic when NBC/ABC's ownership of A&E is taken into account). This was until BET began airing new episodes of The Game in 2011. In 2012, USA Network began airing Common Law.

CTS does not directly produce any shows appearing on Showtime, a premium cable television network co-owned with the studio. Instead, sister company Showtime Entertainment handles in-house productions for the network. However, CTD and its international arm handle syndication distribution for these shows if they ever appear in syndication.

On October 25, 2018, CBS Television Studios announced the opening of a new animation division, CBS Eye Animation Productions. A new Star Trek series entitled Star Trek: Lower Decks was announced at the same time.

It was announced on August 14, 2019, that parent company CBS Corporation would reunite with Viacom to form a combined media company and be renamed ViacomCBS. For the first time in 13 years, ViacomCBS will encompass Paramount's film studio, the current incarnation of its television division and CBS's production studio under one umbrella.

CBS Studios
On October 8, 2020, it was announced that CTS had been renamed CBS Studios as part of a unification of branding elements between CBS divisions, citing that use of the word "Television" in the name was antiquated due to its position of producing programming for multiple platforms.

Past names
 CBS Paramount Television/CBS Paramount Network Television (2006–2009)
CBS Television Studios (2009–2020)
 Paramount Television (1967–2006)
 Desilu Productions (1951–1967)
 CBS Productions (1952–2006, 2008–2012, 2015–2016)

Productions (2009–present)

See also
CBS Media Ventures
Paramount Global Content Distribution
Paramount Television Studios, Paramount's other current television studio and CBS Studios' corporate sibling
Terrytoons

References

External links

 
Television production companies of the United States
Paramount Global subsidiaries
Companies based in Los Angeles
2006 establishments in California
American companies established in 2006
Mass media companies established in 2006